Kyllikki is a Finnish feminine given name that may refer to:
A character in the Finnish epic Kalevala, and a 1904 piano composition by Sibelius named after it
Kyllikki Forssell (1925-2019), Finnish actress
Kyllikki Moisio, a character in the 1905 Finnish novel The Song of the Blood-Red Flower by Johannes Linnankoski
Kyllikki Naukkarinen (1925–2011), Finnish hurdler
Kyllikki Pohjala (1894–1979), Finnish politician
Kyllikki Saari (1935–1953), Finnish homicide victim
Sylvi-Kyllikki Kilpi (1899–1987), Finnish journalist

Finnish feminine given names